Information pollution (also referred to as info pollution) is the contamination of information supply with irrelevant, redundant, unsolicited, hampering  and low-value information. Examples include misinformation, junk e-mail and media violence.

The spread of useless and undesirable information can have a detrimental effect on human activities. It is considered one of the adverse effects of the information revolution.

Overview  
Information pollution generally applies to digital communication, such as e-mail, instant messaging (IM) and social media. The term acquired particular relevance in 2003 when web usability expert Jakob Nielsen published articles discussing the topic. As early as 1971 researchers were expressing doubts about the negative effects of having to recover “valuable nodules from a slurry of garbage in which it is a randomly dispersed minor component.”  People use information in order to make decisions and adapt to circumstances. Cognitive studies demonstrated human beings can process only limited information before the quality of their decisions begins to deteriorate. Information overload is a related concept that can also harm decision-making. It refers to an abundance of available information, without respect to its quality. 

Although technology is thought to have exacerbated the problem, it is not the only cause of information pollution. Anything that distracts attention from the essential facts required to perform a task or make a decision could be considered an information pollutant.

Information pollution is seen as the digital equivalent of the environmental pollution generated by industrial processes. Some authors claim that information overload is a crisis of global proportions, on the same scale as threats faced by environmental destruction. Others have expressed the need for the development of an information management paradigm that parallels environmental management practices.

Manifestations 
The manifestations of information pollution can be classified into two groups: those that provoke disruption, and those that damage information quality.

Typical examples of disrupting information pollutants include unsolicited electronic messages (spam) and instant messages, particularly in the workplace. Mobile phones (ring tones and content) are disruptive in many contexts. Disrupting information pollution is not always technology based. A common example are newspapers, where subscribers read less than half or even none of the articles provided. Superfluous messages, such as unnecessary labels on a map, also distract.

Alternatively, information may be polluted when its quality is reduced. This may be due to inaccurate or out of date information, but it also happens when information is badly presented. For example, when content is unfocused or unclear or when they appear in cluttered, wordy or poorly organised documents it is difficult for the reader to understand. 

Laws and regulations undergo changes and revisions. Handbooks and other sources used for interpreting these laws can fall years behind the changes, which can cause the public to be misinformed.

Causes

Cultural factors
Cultural factors have contributed to information pollution:

Information has been seen traditionally as a good thing. We are used to statements like “you cannot have too much information”, “the more information the better”  and “knowledge is power”. The publishing and marketing industries have become used to printing many copies of books, magazines and brochures regardless of customer demand, just in case they are needed.

New technologies that made it easier for information to reach everyone democratised information sharing. This is perceived as a sign of progress and individual empowerment, as well as a positive step to bridge the divide between the information poor and the information rich. However, it also has the effect of increasing the volume of distracting information. This makes it more difficult to distinguish valuable information from noise. The continuous use of advertising in websites, technologies, newspapers, and every day life is known as "cultural pollution".

Information technology
Technological advances of the 20th century and, in particular, the internet play a key role in the increase of information pollution. Blogs, social networks, personal websites and mobile technology all contribute to increased “noise". The level of pollution may depend on the context. For example, e-mail is likely to cause more information pollution in a corporate setting. Mobile phones are likely to be particularly disruptive in a confined space like a train carriage.

Effects  
The effects of information pollution can be seen at multiple levels.

Individual
At a personal level, information pollution affects individuals' capacity to evaluate options and find adequate solutions. This can lead to information overload and to anxiety, decision paralysis and stress. It can disrupt the learning process.

Society
Some authors argue that information pollution and information overload can cause loss of perspective and moral values. This argument may explain the indifferent attitude that society shows towards topics such as scientific discoveries, health warnings or politics. Pollution makes people less sensitive to headlines and more cynical towards new messages.

Business
Information pollution contributes to information overload and stress and therefore disrupts decisions.  Increased processing time easily translates into loss of productivity and revenue. Flawed decision making increases the risk of critical errors.

Solutions  
Proposed solutions include management techniques and refined technology.
 Technology-based alternatives include decision support systems and dashboards that enable prioritisation of information. Technologies that create frequent interruptions can be replaced with less “polluting” options. Further, technology can improve the presentation quality, aiding understanding.
 E-mail usage policies and information integrity assurance strategies can help. Time management and stress management can be applied. This would involve setting priorities and minimising interruptions. Improved writing and presentation practices can minimise information pollution effects on others.

Related terms
Infollution: The term infollution or informatization pollution was coined by Dr. Paek-Jae Cho, former president & CEO of  KTC (Korean Telecommunication Corp.), in a 2002 speech at the International Telecommunications Society (ITS) 14th biennial conference to describe any undesirable side effect brought about by information technology and its applications.

See also
Digital divide
Information ecology
Information environmentalism
Information explosion
Information overload
Information quality
Information revolution
Information society
Informatization
Spam (electronic)
Stress management
Time management

References

External links 
 Information Pollution – Jakob Nielsen's Alertbox, 2003
 10 Steps for Cleaning Up Information Pollution  – Jakob Nielsen's Alertbox, 2004
 Web guru fights info pollution  – BBC, 2003

Library science
Information science